4/20 may refer to:

 April 20, events that happened on the 20th day of the 4th month in the Gregorian calendar.
 420 (cannabis culture), code-term that refers to the consumption of cannabis.